East Hounsfield Christian Church is a historic church located at Hounsfield in Jefferson County, New York, United States. It was built about 1844 and is a two-story, three bay wide and three bay deep, gable front frame structure with Greek Revival features. A one-story wood frame wing is attached to the rear by a small hyphen.  The front features a two-stage wood belfry.

It was listed on the National Register of Historic Places in 1989.

References

Churches on the National Register of Historic Places in New York (state)
Churches in Jefferson County, New York
National Register of Historic Places in Jefferson County, New York